Loxophlebia masa is a moth of the subfamily Arctiinae. It was described by Herbert Druce in 1889. It is found in Mexico and Honduras.

References

 

Loxophlebia
Moths described in 1889